Savannah Cristina Ashton is an American singer from Fort Lauderdale, Florida. In 2019, she received widespread attention when a YouTube video performance of her song "Self Care" went viral. In 2020, she released her major label debut, Self Care, on Warner Records.

Early life 

Savannah Cristina was born in Miami, Florida, and was raised by an African American father and a Dominican mother. She moved to the Melrose Park neighborhood in Fort Lauderdale at the age of 6. In 2019, she told Miami New Times, "I was raised by my church. I was raised by my school. I was raised by my Boys & Girls Club. I was really raised by the poetry teachers who took their time to invest in my art. All of those people created the woman I am today." She attended Stranahan High School, and graduated from Florida International University with a degree in political science.

Career beginnings 

Cristina began singing in church as well as local community events. She told American Songwriter that she discovered her love of music in second grade, when a choir teacher told her she had a gift. In high school, she started a poetry club and participated in slam competitions, studying performers like Aja Monet and Bertrand Boyd. In April 2016, she signed with the management company TheNuMiami, LLC, which posted her first single, "Spend It on Me," on SoundCloud.

In 2017, she released Mango Season. The title, she told The PoPular Society in 2017, was inspired by the mango trees that bloom in Fort Lauderdale every summer. The following year, she released Florida Girl. She also collaborated with South Florida artists such as Twelve’Len, ¡Mayday!, and Ice Billion Berg, and contributed backing vocals to a track on Denzel Curry's 2018 album Ta13oo.

In 2019, Savannah Cristina signed a record deal with Dollaz N Dealz. She posted videos herself performing around her neighborhood, including a basketball court (for “Rebound”) and a busy intersection (for “Belong to the Streets”). She told Rated R&B, "I got to a point where I wanted people to see what I'm doing, and if that means I have to go out into the street or go into the middle of the beach or go to a basketball court, I'm going to get your attention. So, that's where the inspiration came from. I came up with the idea myself and I love the way everybody accepted the way that they did." She told Flaunt, "All these spots I pick are places from my childhood. The basketball court, I grew up going to that court playing with my dad. That street is the street I caught the city bus to go to school."

Her "Self Care" video was filmed at a local beach. It went viral and eventually garnered 6 million views. She told Yahoo! Life that she was motivated to make the clip because "I felt like I was neglecting myself. I felt like as a woman, as a person, I was neglecting my feelings [and] my responsibilities that I had to myself."

Warner Records began courting her after she released her single, "What You Won't Do," and signed her to a deal in January 2020. Her major label debut, Self Care, was released on October 2, 2020.

Style 

Savannah Cristina has called her music "soul therapy" and "pieces of my diary." Her influences include Beyoncé, Jill Scott, Erykah Badu, PartyNextDoor and Lauryn Hill. 
 
She told American Songwriter, "There's no other setting for me to talk about these things," she says. "I'm somebody that, if you know me, I'm very distant. I dissociate myself from emotions for as long as I can. I don't like saying what's wrong or talking about myself very much. But in music, I can express a side of myself that's very open, very emotional. Even if it's embarrassing or too personal. I almost have to do it."

Discography

EPs

Independent projects

Singles

Guest appearances

References 

Living people
American women singer-songwriters
Warner Records artists
American rhythm and blues singers
Musicians from Fort Lauderdale, Florida
Singer-songwriters from Florida
Musicians from Miami
African-American women singer-songwriters
American people of Dominican Republic descent
21st-century African-American women
21st-century American women singers
21st-century American singers
Year of birth missing (living people)